George R. Locke is a justice in the Federal Court of Appeal of Canada.

References 

Living people
Judges of the Federal Court of Canada
Year of birth missing (living people)
Place of birth missing (living people)